Baren Chandra Barman is an Indian politician from BJP. In May 2021, he was elected as the member of the West Bengal Legislative Assembly from Sitalkuchi.

Career
Barman is from Sitalkuchi, Cooch Behar district. His father's name is Anil Chandra Barman. His son's name is Bikram Barman. He earned a Master of Arts degree from Burdwan University in 2006. He contested in 2021 West Bengal Legislative Assembly election from Sitalkuchi Vidhan Sabha and won the seat on 2 May 2021.

References 

Living people
Year of birth missing (living people)
21st-century Indian politicians
People from Cooch Behar district
Bharatiya Janata Party politicians from West Bengal
West Bengal MLAs 2021–2026